Phullen is a town in Saitual district, in the Indian state of Mizoram.
As per the Constitution of India and Panchayati Raj Act, Phullen is administrated by a Village Council  who are the elected representatives of the village. Phullen is a Block  headquarters of Phullen Block, which is bounded by Darlawn Block  towards west, Ngopa Block towards East,  Thingsulthliah Block  toward south, and Aizawl district in the north.

History
Phullen (earlier Khandaih) was founded by Mizo Chief Vanphunga Sailo, the son of Pawihbawiha Sailo in 1901. After Vanphunga Sailo, his eldest son Awksarala Sailo became the Chief. He ruled Phullen until his death.

Khandaih was considered the biggest village in Mizoram when the British first acquired the land. The village was given importance and was often visited by British officials. The first permanent mission school was established in 1903. It was visited by the Dy Commissioner J Hezlett, ICS in 1912 where Chief Vanphunga welcomed him. The Dy Commissioner told the chief, "Vanphung, ask for anything and I shall give it to you." Vanphunga replied without any prior thought, "As I have several sons, I ask that the rolling range from where River Tuivawl intercepts with River Tuivai to the point where River Tuivawl flows along all the way to River Tuivai be gifted to me so that my sons could branch out in these places." The Dy Commissioner granted this request.

For this reason the reigning chief of Khawlek, a Rahsi named Hrangchhunga moved to Dwarbawn. At age 56, Vanphunga passed away at the village of his concubine, Zawngin  in 1922 due to ‘Dawrnget’ disease. Even though Vanphunga was known for persecuting Christians, he died after converting. Dawrnget disease is what we presently understand as ‘pile problem’. It is said that Sailo chiefs ate too much of meat and many died at a young age. Successor Awksarala shifted to a higher and a more comfortable hill in 1926. This hill was called Phullen Hill. So, Khandaih was renamed to Phullen.

Demographics
Phullen has a population of 1911 of which 954 are males while 957 are females as per Population Census 2011. The population of children with age 0-6 is 288, or 15.07%. The average sex ratio is 1003, which is higher than Mizoram, as it has a state average of 976. The child sex ratio is 1102, which is also higher than Mizoram, with an average of 970.

In 2011, the literacy rate of Pullen was 96.24% higher than the rate of 91.33% of Mizoram. The male literacy rate stands at 96.45% while the female literacy rate was 96.03%.

Culture
The population of Phullen is made up of different ethnic groups. The culture of the Mizo tribes and its social structure has changed since the arrival of Christianity in Mizoram. People of Phullen celebrate Christmas festival, New Year, Chapchar Kut  and other Christian celebrations replacing many tribal customs and practices.

Christianity plays an important role in their cultural, religious and socio-political structure. One such cultural element was Hnatlang,  which literally means social work, united labour or community labour (the word hna‘ means job or work in the Mizo language; and tlang‘ means together and mutual). Tribal members who were absent from such social work (for reasons other than illness and disability) were penalised—a form of strong peer pressure. Jhum cultivation and raids on neighboring tribes required Hnatlang, the spirit of united labour and equal sharing of the end result.

Administrative structure
Phullen is headed by the Village Council President. Almost all issues regarding the village administration are under this authority. The President and Village Council Members exercised all matters of village administration with regards to law and order and development projects. Some aid groups such like Young Mizo Association (YMA) and Mizo Hmeichhe Insuihkhawm Pawl (MHIP) play an important role in social issues, which may reduce the burdens of the village council members.

Phullen is the block headquarters of Phullen Block, headed by the Block Development Officer (BDO). 12 villages and 12 village councils make up the Phullen Block.

Landmarks
 Sahlam—Sahlam tree where Mizo warriors hung enemy heads. The tree still exists.
 Khandaih Bethel—The place where the first Christian revival took place in Mizoram at Khandaih on 8 April 1906. This is also a place where the mission had established a village school in Khandaih in August 1903 which was the first village school in the whole of Mizoram. Hranga (2) was its first school teacher. It is about 1 kilometre from the heart of village, which is Diakkawn.
 Diakkawn—Center of the village with a marketplace and offices
 Lalruanga Tui thuhruk—Fresh water source named after the famous legendary Lalruanga in Mawmrang Mountain 8 kilometers from Phullen village. Lalruanga history is one of the interesting, excellent and famous in MIZO folktales. According to the story Lalruanga leh Keichala, mankind is supposed to have first learnt the art of magic from a deity called Vanhrika, the keeper of all knowledge.
 Hmunte tlang—Peak 4 kilometres from Phullen.
 Kulhkawn—Historical place for social gathering, sports and some important festival. It is 3 kilometres from the village center.
 Supply thlak Tlang—Helipad where Army supplies arrived during insurgency.
 Licheng—Located in Tuivai river about 5 kilometres away.
 Thangteeka Lungdawh—home of differently abled person from unknown village. He visited almost all the village in Mizoram. He settled in Khandaih (after Phullen) and died.
 Awksarala Thlan—Awksarala Thlan is the tomb of the Phullen Chief Awksarala, located at Lalhuan Tlang in Phullen, Aizawl District, Mizoram, India.
 Chalbuanga Lungdawh—Memorial stone for the first Mizo Christian Martar, located near Phullen Presbyterian Church in Phullen.

Education
 Phulleh Higher Secondary School—private school run by the Phullen community located at the western part of Phullen
 Government National High School—government high school located at the northern part of Phullen
 Government Middle School-I—government middle school located at the western part of Phullen
 Government Middle School-II—government middle school located at the western part of Phullen
 Government Primary School-I—government primary school located at the north western part of Phullen
 Government Primary School-II—government primary school located at the eastern part of Phullen
 Christian Children School—private comprehensive school for primary level up to middle level which was located at the western part of Phullen
 Presbyterian English School—private comprehensive school for primary level to middle level, located at the western part of Phullen

Health care
 Primary Health Centre (PHC)—Government Hospital located in the eastern part of the village. It is headed by a Medical Officer. 
 Phullen Health Sub-Centre—located at the western part of Phullen.

Attractions
 Sahlam—Sahlam is a tree where Mizo warriors hung enemy heads. The village warriors used to bring back the head of their enemy and hung it on Sahlam. The tree still exists and stands in Phullen. It is located 500 meters from the heart of the village, i.e. Diakkawn.
 Khandaih Bethel—This is the place where the first Christian revival took place in Mizoram at Khandaih on 8 April 1906. This is also a place where the mission had established a village school in Khandaih in August 1903 which was the first village school in the whole of Mizoram, with the grudging permission of Vanphunga, the chief of Khandaih. Hranga (2) was its first school teacher. It is about 1 kilometre from the heard of village – Diakkawn.
 Lalruanga Tui thuhruk—It is a fresh water source named after the famous legendary Lalruanga in Mawmrang Mountain 8 kilometers from Phullen village.
 Chalbuanga Lungdawh—It is a memorial stone for the first Mizo Christian Martar, located near Phullen Presbyterian Church in Phullen.
Awksarala Thlan—Awksarala Sailo was the chief of Phullen. His tomb ‘Awksarala Thlan’ is located 1 km away from Diakkawn, heart of the village.

Transport
The main transportation mode of the village is daily private Maxi Cab service between Phullen to Aizawl, and Aizawl to Phullen. There are around 8 maxi cab services between Phullen and the state capital city Aizawl.

Media

Newspaper
 Lentlang—weekly news paper published by Young Mizo Association (YMA) Phullen branch. 
 Kohhran Inleng—weekly newspaper published by Kristian Thalai Pawl (KTP) Phullen Branch. 
 Kohhran Kantu—weekly newspaper published by Kristian Thalai Pawl (KTP) Phullen vengthar Branch.

Television
 Pautu Vision—Pautu vision is the only cable network in Phullen and functions as a sub-operator for LPS Cable Network, Aizawl. It has been digitalize since 2016.

Notables
 Thangteeka—He was a differently able person from an unknown village, as he has no close or distant relatives either, visiting almost all the villages in Mizoram. He lived anywhere if they shared space him, and went wherever wanted to. At last he decided to settle in Khandaih (Phullen) and died.
 Chalbuanga— Chalbuanga was the first Mizo Christian martyr.

Gallery

References

Villages in Aizawl district